Minuscule 439 (in the Gregory-Aland numbering), Scrivener 439, ε 240 (in the Soden numbering), is a Greek minuscule manuscript of the New Testament, on parchment. It is dated by a colophon to the year 1159.
The marginal apparatus is complete. The text represents the Byzantine tradition.

Description 

The codex contains a complete text of the four Gospels on 219 parchment leaves. The text is written in two columns per page, in 23 lines per page.

There is also a division according to the Ammonian Sections, with references to the Eusebian Canons (written below Ammonian Section numbers).

Text 

The Greek text of the codex is a representative of the Byzantine text-type. Hermann von Soden classified it to the textual family Kx. Aland placed it in Category V.
According to the Claremont Profile Method it re presents the textual family Kx in Luke 1 and Luke 20, and belongs to the textual cluster 877. In Luke 10 no profile was made.

History 

The manuscript was written by Nephon, a monk from Athos in April, 1159. It once belonged to Anthony Askew (1722–1774) (as codices 438 and 443). It was examined by Bloomfield. The manuscript was added to the list of New Testament manuscripts by Scholz (1794–1852).
C. R. Gregory saw it in 1883.

It is currently housed at the British Library in London (Add MS 5107) .

See also 

 List of New Testament minuscules
 Biblical manuscript
 Textual criticism

References

Further reading

External links 
 Add MS 5107 Digitised Manuscripts at the British Library

Greek New Testament minuscules
12th-century biblical manuscripts